Masterpieces is a compilation album by American singer-songwriter Bob Dylan, released on March 12, 1978 by CBS. The triple LP set was released in Japan, Australia and New Zealand in anticipation of his 1978 tour. Primarily a greatest hits collection spanning Dylan's career up to that point, the album features one previously unreleased track, a unique (1962) outtake version of "Mixed-Up Confusion". It also includes a live performance of "Just Like Tom Thumb's Blues" from Dylan's 1966 World Tour, which was first released as the B-side of his "I Want You" single in 1966. Masterpieces was reissued on CD in 1991 by Columbia (Cat. No. 4624489), but is no longer in print.

Track listing
All songs written by Bob Dylan, except where noted.

Certifications and sales

References

1978 greatest hits albums
Albums produced by Bob Dylan
Albums produced by Bob Johnston
Albums produced by Don DeVito
Albums produced by Garth Hudson
Albums produced by John Hammond (producer)
Albums produced by Leon Russell
Albums produced by Levon Helm
Albums produced by Richard Manuel
Albums produced by Rick Danko
Albums produced by Rob Fraboni
Albums produced by Robbie Robertson
Albums produced by Tom Wilson (record producer)
Bob Dylan compilation albums
Columbia Records compilation albums